Parliamentary elections were held in Burkina Faso on 6 May 2007. The result was a victory for the ruling Congress for Democracy and Progress (CDP), which won 73 of the 111 seats in the National Assembly.

Results

References

Burkina Faso
Elections in Burkina Faso
Parliamentary election